Angela "Angel" Wainaina (1983 – 28 January 2009) was a Kenyan actress, radio presenter and rapper.

Life
Wainaina was born 1983 in Kawangware, a slum of Nairobi, Kenya.  She joined a drama club at Kambui High School. She was a runner up at the Miss Kenya competition in 2005. She was a poet and underground rapper. She played Sergeant Maria in the popular television show "Cobra Squad".

On 15 January 2007, she began working for Ghetto Radio, as Kenya's first female MC. Her show "Chanuka Dada" was very popular, and she was well known for her energetic social advocacy. She was awarded the Young Women African Summit's media award.

Death
Wainaina died on 28 January 2009 in the Nakumatt supermarket fire. Her funeral was held at the Holy Family Cathedral in Nairobi.

References 

1983 births
2009 deaths
Kenyan television actresses
Kenyan journalists
21st-century Kenyan actresses
20th-century journalists